Augsburg Airport  is a regional airport in Affing,  northeast of the city of Augsburg, the third largest city in the German state of Bavaria. It is used for business and general aviation with very little passenger airline traffic.

History

The airport was opened in 1968 after its predecessor in the southern suburb Haunstetten had to be closed due to the construction of the new University of Augsburg on the airfield compound.

In 1986, Interot Airways commenced scheduled flight services at Augsburg Airport, initially to Düsseldorf. By the early 1990s, Interot's route network at Augsburg Airport had grown to also include Berlin, Cologne, Dresden, Hamburg and Leipzig, so that the airport was considered an alternative for business travellers who wished to avoid busy Munich Airport.

In 1995, Augsburg Airport saw the inauguration of international flights by Interot Airways, most notably to London City Airport.

Following Interot Airways having become a member of Team Lufthansa in 1996, the airline (which by then had been renamed Augsburg Airways) scaled down its presence at Augsburg Airport in favor of Munich Airport; the last routes were terminated in 2002.

After 2005 passenger traffic was relocated to Munich Airport, leaving the Augsburg region without a passenger airport within close reach. Since then, the airport is used almost entirely for general aviation and business airplanes. Passenger flights resumed in 2016 with a once-per-week flight to Salzburg.

Airlines and destinations
As of September 2019, there are currently no scheduled or charter flights at the airport.

Ground transportation
A ground transport connection by road exists to the nearby six-lane motorway A8 Munich (25min) - Stuttgart (1h) (Exit Augsburg Ost). Alternatively, bus 305 runs every hour from Augsburg main train station.

See also
 Transport in Germany
 List of airports in Germany

References

External links

 Official website
 
 

Airports established in 1968
Airports in Bavaria
Transport in Augsburg